On Lung Tsuen, also transliterated as On Loong Tsuen, is a village in the San Tin area of Yuen Long District, Hong Kong.

Administration
On Loong Tsuen is a recognized village under the New Territories Small House Policy.

References

External links
 Delineation of area of existing village On Lung Tsuen (San Tin) for election of resident representative (2019 to 2022)

Villages in Yuen Long District, Hong Kong
San Tin